The Joy of Science is a popular video and audio course series, consisting of 60 lectures, each 30 minutes long, presented by Robert Hazen of the George Mason University and the Carnegie Institution of Washington. The course, first introduced in 2001, is part of The Great Courses series, and is produced and distributed by The Teaching Company, located in Chantilly, Virginia, in the United States.

Background 

As the Clarence B. Robinson Professor at George Mason University, Robert Hazen developed innovative courses to promote scientific literacy in both scientists and non-scientists. In a collaboration with physicist James Trefil, he wrote three undergraduate textbooks: The Sciences: An Integrated Approach (1993), The Physical Sciences: An Integrated Approach (1995), and Physics Matters: An Introduction to Conceptual Physics (2004). Hazen used these as the basis for a 60-lecture video and audio course called The Joy of Science.

Description

See also 

 Abiogenesis
 Continental drift
 Cosmology
 Earth science
 Evolution
 The World We Live In (Life magazine)

References

Further reading

External links
 The Joy of Science/GuideBook
 Dr. Robert Hazen (Carnegie Science Center; May 2018)
 Minerals and the Origins of Life (Robert Hazen; NASA; video; 60m; April 2014).
 Art of the Wikipedia Nature Timelines

Adult education
Alternative education
High school course levels
Learning programs
Science education
United States educational programs